Love and Hate is a 1924 British silent comedy film directed by Thomas Bentley and starring George Foley, Eve Chambers and Frank Perfitt. It was made by British & Colonial Kinematograph Company at the company's Walthamstow Studios.

Cast
George Foley as Apps
Eve Chambers as Mrs. Williams
Frank Perfitt as Tompson
Sydney Fairbrother

Bibliography
Low, Rachael. (1971). History of the British Film, 1918-1929. George Allen & Unwin.

External links

1924 films
1924 comedy films
British comedy films
1920s English-language films
Films directed by Thomas Bentley
British black-and-white films
British silent short films
1920s British films
Silent comedy films